Bernhard Werthemann (born c. 1966) is a Swiss curler and curling coach.

At the national level, he is a 2003 Swiss men's champion curler.

Currently he is the coach of team Yannick Schwaller.

Teams

Record as a coach of national teams

References

External links

Bernhard-Werthemann in XING ⇒ in Das Örtliche

Living people
Swiss male curlers
Swiss curling champions
Swiss curling coaches
1960s births
Place of birth missing (living people)